T Carinae is a star in the southern constellation of Carina. Although given a variable star designation, it is now thought to be constant; the identifier HD 94776 from the Henry Draper catalogue may be used instead. It has an orange hue and is dimly visible to the naked eye with an apparent visual magnitude of 5.93. The distance to this object is approximately 285 light years based on parallax, and it has an absolute magnitude of 1.08. It is drifting closer to the Sun with a radial velocity of −26 km/s.

This is an aging giant star with a stellar classification of K0III, which indicates it has exhausted the supply of hydrogen at its core and expanded off the main sequence. It is a red clump giant, which means it is on the horizontal branch and is undergoing core helium fusion. At present it has nine times the Sun's radius and is radiating 39 times the luminosity of the Sun from its photosphere at an effective temperature of 4,729 K.

When used as a comparison star for AG Carinae in 1914 by H. E. Wood, this object was announced as a candidate variable star. A year later it was determined by R. Innis that it was AG Carinae that varied and this star is constant. Later, T Carinae became flagged as a low amplitude irregular variable. It is now catalogued as a probable constant star.

References 

K-type giants
Horizontal-branch stars
Suspected variables

Carina (constellation)
Durchmusterung objects
094776
053394
4271
Carinae, T